The Film Detective is an American classic film restoration, distribution, and streaming company based in Rockport, Massachusetts, and is a division of the American entertainment company, Cinedigm. Launched in 2013, The Film Detective offers an extensive library of over 3,000+ hours of classic films and television series, with a focus on both renowned classics and B-movies across genres including comedy, drama, film noir, horror, musical, mystery, science fiction, and silent. Services offered by The Film Detective include a classic film and television app on web, iOS, Android, Roku, Amazon Fire TV and Apple TV; a 24/7 linear channel offered across multiple leading OTT platforms including Sling TV, Plex, STIRR, DistroTV, Local Now, and Rakuten TV; and exclusive, limited-run Blu-ray and DVD releases.

History
The Film Detective was launched in 2013 by founder Phil Hopkins, film archivist and producer, and previous co-founder of Marengo Films, Dogtown Productions, Inc., and Film Chest. In 2016, The Film Detective launched its classic film and television app on Roku, Amazon Fire TV, and Apple TV, featuring iconic titles, including rare silent films, westerns, film noir, musicals and comedies.

The Film Detective's 24/7 classic film and television channel joined Sling TV's free, live and VOD offerings in 2018, followed by DistroTV and STIRR in 2019; Plex and Glewed TV in 2020; and Local Now, RakutenTV, TCL, LG (US), and Kapang in 2021. In May 2020, The Film Detective announced the launch of its Android app, bringing over four thousand hours of classic film and television to Android users.

The Film Detective features the voice of Dana Hersey, former host of The Movie Loft and legendary broadcast host.

In November 2021, The Film Detective launched its first classic film and television app, hosted by classic radio expert Carl Amari. In 2021, The Film Detective announced it would release an original series, Classic Films for Kids, hosted by author Jennifer Churchill and her sidekick Weston, coming in 2022.

Services
The Film Detective offers an extensive library of over 4,000+ hours of classic films and television series, with a focus on both renowned classics and B-movies across genres including comedy, drama, film noir, horror, musical, mystery, science fiction, and silent.

The Film Detective is available through The Film Detective classic film and television app, The Film Detective 24/7 linear channel available across multiple leading OTT platforms including Sling TV and Plex, and The Film Detective's special edition Blu-ray and DVD releases. The Film Detective's classic film restorations are also featured on leading broadcast channels and platforms including Turner Classic Movies, NBC, EPIX, PBS, MeTV, and more.

Programming on The Film Detective 24/7 classic film and television channel features daily curation of horror films, daytime TV, classic comedies and musicals, westerns and adventures, and drama, mystery, and film noir titles. The Film Detective channel offers monthly thematic promotions and weekly features, including Saturday morning cartoons like Superman, Popeye, and Betty Boop; Sunday Serials like The Perils of Pauline and Flash Gordon; and late night weekday TV including The Carol Burnett Show and The Johnny Carson Show. The 24/7 channel is similar in format and programming to 1980's Nostalgia Channel.

In 2020, The Film Detective launched its first content-specific channel, The Lone Star Channel, featuring classic western films and television. The Lone Star Channel is available on Sling TV, DistroTV, Rakuten TV, and Local Now. The channel offers B-westerns, classic western television including Bonanza, The Lone Ranger, and The Roy Rogers Show, singing cowboys like Gene Autry, Tex Ritter, and Roy Rogers, and an evening Dinner with the Duke programming hour featuring John Wayne.

The Film Detective App
Launched in 2016, The Film Detective app is available on web, iOS, Android, Roku, Apple TV, and Amazon Fire TV. The Film Detective app offers restored classics from fan favorites like Charade, His Girl Friday, The Phantom of the Opera, Royal Wedding, Two Women, Sounder, Kansas City Confidential, and House on Haunted Hill. The Film Detective app also features collections of B-movies, drive-in favorites, and underrepresented favorites including The Giant Gila Monster, Creature from the Haunted Sea, A Bucket of Blood, and more.

The Film Detective app also features over 40 television series including You Bet Your Life, Life with Elizabeth, The Lucy Show, Dragnet, The Carol Burnett Show, The Beverly Hillbillies, and Bonanza. Partner films and series available on The Film Detective app include Shout! Factory, Something Weird Video, Trailers from Hell, the British Film Institute, VCI Entertainment, Independent International Pictures, and C3 Entertainment. The Film Detective app showcases original content, often narrated by The Movie Loft host and broadcast legend Dana Hersey, including tributes, documentaries, and film introductions.

The Film Detective Podcast 
In October 2021, The Film Detective announced the launch of The Film Detective Podcast, the company's inaugural classic podcast. The Film Detective Podcast is dedicated to classic radio programs from the Golden Age of Radio, hosted by Carl Amari, film producer, syndicated radio host and a foremost authority on the golden age of radio. Through his company, Gulfstream Studios, Amari has spent decades licensing the rights to more than 50,000 hours of original radio programming. Amari has brought radio expertise as producer of multiple award-winning shows, including serving as creator/producer of The Twilight Zone Radio Dramas and producer/host of Hollywood 360.

The Film Detective Podcast rediscovers full classic radio programs including mystery and detective shows like The New Adventures of Sherlock Holmes, The Adventures of the Thin Man, Dragnet, and The Adventures of Sam Spade, Detective; comedies including The Burns & Allen Show, Father Knows Best, and The Jack Benny Program; science fiction and suspense including X Minus One and Suspense; and westerns like Have Gun Will Travel, Gunsmoke, and The Roy Rogers Show. The Film Detective Podcast is available via Spotify, Apple Podcasts, YouTube, Audacy, Stitcher, etc.

Restorations 
The Film Detective releases hundreds of restored classic films on Blu-ray and DVD on Amazon, Allied Vaughn, and MVD, including Crackdown Big City Blues.

The Film Detective also offers special edition Blu-ray and DVD releases, often featuring collections of bonus features in collaboration with Ballyhoo Motion Pictures, ranging from film noir, to musical, and cult classic titles.

See also
 Turner Classic Movies
 Movies!
 Family Movie Classics
 Nostalgia Channel
 Cinedigm

References

External links
 

Classic television networks
Nostalgia television in the United States
Film preservation
Movie channels
Movie channels in the United States
Commercial-free television networks
Cinedigm